Constructed near the beginning of the 20th century, until 2014 the Cairo tramway network was still used in modern-day Cairo, especially in modern areas, like Heliopolis and Nasr City. During the 1970s, government policies favoured making space for cars, resulting in the removal of over half of the  network. Trams were removed entirely from central Cairo but continued to run in Heliopolis and Helwan. 

However, Helwan's part of the system shut down completely in the aftermath of the 2011 Egyptian revolution, and in 2014–2015 the surviving tram service in Heliopolis was almost entirely discontinued. Only a short section of one line in Heliopolis, between Court Square and the Tivoli Dome, continued to be operated. By the end of 2019, service had ceased definitively, with tracks dismantled in order to widen the neighborhood's roads.

References

Transport in Cairo
Cairo
Public transport in Egypt
Metre gauge railways in Egypt
Railway lines opened in 1896